Baurzhan Mukhamejanov (Bauyrjan Älımūly Mūhamedjanov; born 26 November 1960) is a Kazakh politician and Doctor of Law who served as Kazakhstan's Ambassador to Georgia from May 30, 2018 to December 9, 2022. Prior to that, Mukhamejanov was the ambassador to Lithuania and Latvia, äkim of Mangystau Region from 22 December 2011 to 18 January 2013, Minister of Internal Affairs from 14 October 2005 to 2 April 2009, Deputy Prime Minister of Kazakhstan from 29 January 2002 to 13 June 2003, and Minister of Justice from 13 October 1997 to 13 September 2000.

Biography

Early life and education 
Baurzhan Mukhamejanov was born to a Muslim family in the Kazakh village of Merki. He is the son of Alim Mukhamedjanov.  In 1983, he graduated from Al-Farabi Kazakh National University with a degree in law.

In 1990, he defended his candidate thesis on the theme "Ecological Function of the Soviet State" and in 2008, the doctoral thesis on the theme "Form of Government of the Republic of Kazakhstan: Constitutional Model and Government Control Practice" in the Russian Presidential Academy of National Economy and Public Administration.

Career 
Mukhamejanov started his career in 1983 as a research assistant, teacher of the State and Law Theory and History Division of the Law Department in the Al-Farabi Kazakh National University.

From 1990 to 1994, he was a senior consultant, head of the Sector, deputy head of the Department, head of the Secretariat of the Chairman and the Legislation and Legal Due Diligence Department of the Supreme Soviet of Kazakhstan. From February to April 1994, Mukhamejanov took the position of Deputy Head, then Head of the Legislative Initiatives Department of the Presidential Administration of Kazakhstan. In February 1994, Mukhamejanov became the Head of the Legislation and Legal Due Diligence Department of the Administration. From December 1996, he served as the Head of the Department for Legislation, Judicial and Legal System until becoming the Secretary of the Supreme Court Council of Kazakhstan.

While serving as a Secretary, Mukhamejanov was appointed as a Minister of Justice on 13 October 1997. From September 2000, he was the Head of the State and Legal Department and Deputy Head of the Presidential Administration. While serving the post, Mukhamejanov became the Chairman of the Permanently Functioning Meeting on the issues of democratization in Kazakhstan in 2001. On 29 January 2002, he was appointed as a Deputy Prime Minister of Kazakhstan.

From 2003, Mukhamejanov served as the Deputy of Presidential Administration of the President and at the same time from March 2004 as the Head of the Organizational and Control Work and Staffing Policy Administration and the Head of the State Legal Directorate. In December 2004, Mukhamejanov was appointed as the Chairman of the Commission for Higher Military and Other Ranks. He served the post until he became the Minister of Internal Affairs on 14 October 2005 and at the same time was a member of the Security Council of Kazakhstan. During his tenure, he became the Chairman of the National Coordinators Council of the Central Asian Regional Information Coordination Center on 26 February 2009 to combat trafficking in narcotic drugs, psychotropic substances and their precursors. This Center included countries Kazakhstan, Azerbaijan, Uzbekistan, Kyrgyzstan, Tajikistan, and Turkmenistan.

On 2 April 2009, Mukhamejanov as a member of the member of the Senate of Kazakhstan. He worked in this position until becoming the äkim of Mangystau Region on 22 December 2011 following the Zhanaozen massacre. He was eventually replaced by Alik Aidarbaev on 18 January 2013.

On 26 March 2013, he became the Ambassador of Kazakhstan to Lithuania, and from 21 May 2013, Mukhamejanov was the ambassador to Latvia at the same time. On May 30, 2018, he was dismissed from these positions. And was appointed Ambassador to Georgia, remaining in this position until December 9, 2022.

Law making
Mukhamejanov was the member of work groups and participated in preparation of the following laws of the Republic of Kazakhstan:

1) Kazakh SSR State Sovereignty Declaration – October 25, 1990;

2) State Independence Constitutional Law of the Republic of Kazakhstan dated December 16, 1991;

3) The first Constitution of independent Kazakhstan adopted in 1993;

4) 1995 Constitution. Under supervision of the RK President N.A. Nazarbayev. Mukhamejanov was one of three drafters together with N. Shaikenov and K. Kolpakov.

5) Being the Head of the Legislative Initiatives Department of the Office of the President of the Republic of Kazakhstan, he took part in development of more than 130 Decrees of the President having the effect of Law.

Awards 
 Barys Order of the II degree (2010)
 Barys Order of the III degree (2004)
 Parassat Order (1999)
 Certificate of Honour of the Republic of Kazakhstan
 Certificate of Honour of the Parliament Senate of the Republic of Kazakhstan
 Above 20 medals, including of Russian Federation, Belarus, Armenia, Azerbaijan, Georgia, Ukraine, Kyrgyzstan, Tajikistan.

Diplomatic rank 
On 2 July 2020, during the occasion of the Diplomatic Service Day of Kazakhstan, President Kassym-Jomart Tokayev assigned to Mukhamejanov the diplomatic rank of the Extraordinary and Plenipotentiary Ambassador.

References 

|-

1960 births
Living people
Ambassadors of Kazakhstan to Latvia
Ambassadors of Kazakhstan to Lithuania
Deputy Prime Ministers of Kazakhstan
Government ministers of Kazakhstan
Members of the Senate of Kazakhstan
People from Jambyl Region